Stéphane Rochon (born 15 March 1974) is a Canadian freestyle skier. He competed at the 1998 Winter Olympics and the 2002 Winter Olympics.

References

1974 births
Living people
Canadian male freestyle skiers
Olympic freestyle skiers of Canada
Freestyle skiers at the 1998 Winter Olympics
Freestyle skiers at the 2002 Winter Olympics
Sportspeople from Laval, Quebec